Vincenzo Musolino (9 May 1930 – 9 May 1969) was an Italian actor, director, producer and screenwriter.

Life and career 
Musolino was born in Reggio Calabria into a humble family, and lived as a fisherman. During the military service he held in Venice, he was chosen by Renato Castellani for the leading role of Antonio in the neorealist drama Two Cents Worth of Hope. Following the success of the film, Musolino  appeared in several films, mainly in supporting roles. In 1964, he dedicated himself to the production of genre films, often working with director Edoardo Mulargia, with whom he also wrote several screenplays. In 1968, one year before his premature death, he was the director to two low-budget Spaghetti Westerns, in which he was credited as Glenn Vincent Davis.

Selected filmography
 The Triumph of Robin Hood (1962)

References

External links 
 

1930 births
1969 deaths
20th-century Italian male actors
Italian male film actors
Italian film directors
Italian film producers
20th-century Italian screenwriters
Italian male screenwriters
People from Reggio Calabria
20th-century Italian male writers